Take A Good Look is a 1990 children's novel by Jacqueline Wilson.

Plot summary
Mary is a nine-year-old partially sighted girl. She is tired of her lack of freedom due to her impaired eyesight, and one day when her grandmother is asleep Mary sneaks out to get some chocolate, crisps and coke. She is then caught up in a robbery and is kidnapped by two men. She manages to escape and helps the police trap the robbers.

References 

1990 British novels
1990 children's books
British children's novels
Novels by Jacqueline Wilson